Peter Prodromou (born 14 January 1969) is a British/Greek-Cypriot aerodynamicist and engineer. Currently, he is working as Chief Engineer (Aerodynamics) for the McLaren Formula One team.

Biography
Prodromou originally joined McLaren's design office in 1991, later becoming the team's chief aerodynamicist. He left the team in 2006, alongside Adrian Newey, for Red Bull Racing working as Head of Aerodynamics. In late 2014 he rejoined McLaren as Chief Engineer. In 2017 he became the team's chief technical officer, responsible for aerodynamics.

References

Formula One designers
British people of Cypriot descent
British people of Greek Cypriot descent
Living people
1969 births
McLaren people